Emmy Burg (1903–1982) was a German film and television actress.

Selected filmography
 The Beaver Coat (1949)
 Homesick for You (1952)
 Bon Voyage (1954)
 The Witch (1954)
 Before God and Man (1955)
 The Story of Anastasia (1956)
 It Happened Only Once (1958)
 Confess, Doctor Corda (1958)
 Adorable Arabella (1959)

References

Bibliography
 Rentschler, Eric. German Film & Literature. Routledge, 2013.

External links

1903 births
1982 deaths
German film actresses
German television actresses
People from Wiesbaden